This is the list of volleyball clubs operating (or was operated) in Estonia. The list is incomplete.

References 

 
Volleyball-related lists
Volleyball
Lists of organizations based in Estonia